The Trial of St. Orange is the second album of the Montreal-based collective, Shalabi Effect.

Track listing
 "Sundog Ash" – 4:09
 "Saint Orange" – 5:28
 "Mr. Titz (The Revelator)" – 4:13
 "One Last Glare" – 6:29
 "Sister Sleep" – 4:04
 "Uma" – 3:59
 "A Glow in the Dark" – 21:34

References

2002 albums
Shalabi Effect albums
Alien8 Recordings albums